Bernice Lee ("Burr") Singer (born St. Louis, Missouri November 20, 1912; died Los Angeles, California November 18, 1992) was an American artist who worked in Social Realism subject matter, principally in watercolor, oil paint, and lithography. Singer is noted as a painter of African Americans who "spent the entire 1930s painting African-Americans because she said that nobody was painting them realistically. Everything else was stereotypical, caricatures."

References

Further reading

External links
Missouri Remembers: Artists in Missouri through 1951

1912 births
1992 deaths
20th-century American women artists
American women painters
Artists from St. Louis